Matelea baldwyniana is a species of climbing or trailing vine with white flowers in the family Apocynaceae (dogbane), known by the common name Baldwin's milkvine and white spinypod. It previously belonged to the family Asclepiadaceae (milkweed). It is native to the central and southeastern United States.

Description
The stems are brownish, hairy, and have a milky sap. The leaves are green, broadly ovate, and opposite, with smooth margins.

The flowers, borne in clusters of 15 or more on long peduncles, are white with a disc-like central column with five anthers and five twisting white petals that are joined at the base.

Etymology
The specific epithet honors American botanist William Baldwin (1779 - 1819).

Distribution and habitat
Matelea baldwyniana is native to the central and southeastern United States in the states of Oklahoma, Arkansas, Missouri, Mississippi, Alabama, Georgia, and Florida. The plant is mostly present in Arkansas and Missouri, with only isolated populations or historical references in the other states. Its habitat is forest clearings, woods, slopes of ravines, glades, and savannas.

Ecology
Flowering occurs April to June. M. baldwyniana is a host plant for caterpillars of the monarch butterfly.

References

baldwyniana
Flora of the Southeastern United States